Robertson Landing is a boat landing on the north side of Ardery Island, near the west end of the island, in the Windmill Islands. A landing was first made here by Phillip Law and an ANARE (Australian National Antarctic Research Expeditions) party from the launch Robertson of Melbourne, donor of the launch.

Ports and harbours of Wilkes Land
Landforms of Wilkes Land